Suriname, then still a constituent country of the Netherlands, competed at the 1972 Summer Olympics in Munich, West Germany.

Athletics

Men

Judo

Men

References
Official Olympic Reports

Nations at the 1972 Summer Olympics
1972
1972 in Suriname